Dukwon High School (also known as Dukwon, or Dukwon HS; Hangeul: 덕원고등학교, 덕원고; Hanja: 德元高等學校) is a private preparatory school in Suseong-gu, Daegu, South Korea.  The school's motto is "Aim high and nourish force" and, its symbol is the zelkova tree.
Like most schools in Korea, Dukwon High School starts its school year in March, starts its second semester in August, and ends the school year in February. There is a weeklong spring break in mid-February.

History

Origins 

On August 24, 1978, Dr. Jin-won Kim was approved to establish an education foundation, Dukwon Education Foundation, and on February 28, 1980, the new school building was completed in Hwanggeum-dong, Suseong-gu, Daegu. On March 1 of 1980, the first Principal Byeong-sip Seo was inaugurated, and on March 5 the first freshman entered. At this time, 10 classes per grade were accredited and the number of classes continued to increase.
21 years after the school was established, the plan to change the location was approved. The groundbreaking ceremony was held on April 27, 2001. On February 28, 2002, it was moved to 37, Uksu-gil, Suseong-gu, Daegu. In the same year, Cheongramsa (Hangeul: 청람사; Hanja: 靑藍舍), dormitory was opened.

Admissions
By the law of private school education, Dukwon High School was selected to be a privately operated high school above numerous other schools. The students who have a higher GPA than other students in their middle school can apply to Dukwon High School.

Notable alumni

 Taeghwan Hyeon '80, chemist, director of IBS, AE of JACS
 Jeong-su Kim '80, Lieutenant General, Superintendent of Korea Military Academy
 Kyung-cheol Park '80, doctor, writer of 'A Beautiful Walk with Rustic Doctor(시골의사의 아름다운 동행)'
 Seong-yong Youn '82, Director of National Folk Museum of Korea
 An-su Park '83, Major General, Commander of The 39th Infantry Division(Republic of Korea)
 Ji-man Hong '84, Secretary for Political Affairs of Office of the President (South Korea), former journalist, former member of the National Assembly of the Republic of Korea
 Sung-soo Kwon '87, Presiding Judge of Seoul Central District Court
 Jin-su Bae '97, comics artist, creator of 'Money Game(머니게임)'
 E Sens(Min-ho Kang) 2003, rapper

External links 
 

Educational institutions established in 1980
High schools in Daegu